Metrorail is an operator of commuter rail services in the major urban areas of South Africa. It is a division of the Passenger Rail Agency of South Africa (PRASA), a state-owned enterprise which is responsible for most passenger rail services in South Africa. The Metrorail system consists of 471 stations,  of track, and carries an average of 1.7 million passengers per weekday.

Metrorail was formed in 1996 as a business unit of Transnet and was transferred to the South African Rail Commuter Corporation (SARCC), the predecessor of PRASA. In the early-1990s Metrorail was placed under Spoornet, another business unit of Transnet but on 1 January 1997, Metrorail became an independent business within Transnet and the Metrorail regions were formed. In 2006 Metrorail was transferred back into the SARCC; in 2008 the SARCC became PRASA.

Regions
Because Metrorail operates services in several separate cities, for operational purposes it is subdivided into four regions.

Gauteng region

Previously there were two regions: Witwatersrand in the south and Tshwane in the north.
The southern area covers the Greater Johannesburg Metropolitan Area (also known as the Witwatersrand). Trains run from Johannesburg and Germiston outwards to Springs, Pretoria, Soweto and Randfontein via Krugersdorp.

The northern part covers Pretoria and surrounding suburbs. Trains run from Pretoria station outwards to the various suburbs of the city, as well as southwards to Johannesburg via Kempton Park and Germiston stations (in the Witwatersrand region).

Durban region

This region covers Durban and the surrounding suburbs and towns. Trains run from Durban station outwards as far as Stanger on the north coast, Kelso on the south coast, and Cato Ridge inland.

Eastern Cape region

This region operates two separate lines in the Eastern Cape: one running from East London to Berlin, and one from Port Elizabeth to Uitenhage. Plans are in the pipeline to connect the service to Coega.

Western Cape region

This region covers the Cape Town metropolitan area and surrounding towns. Trains run from Cape Town railway station southwards to Simon's Town, southeastwards to Mitchell's Plain and Khayelitsha, and eastwards through Bellville to Strand, Stellenbosch and Wellington; occasional services run to Malmesbury and Worcester.

Track and equipment

Metrorail trains, as with the rest of the South African rail network, run on  track. Some routes run on track owned and operated by PRASA; other routes run on track operated by Transnet and also used for long-distance and freight trains.

Most Metrorail services are operated by electric multiple unit train sets of the domestically built 5M2A type and the Japanese-built 8M type. Since 1999, the 5M2A trains are being refurbished. Everything above the underframe is completely removed, and replaced by new, prefabricated wall and roof modules. In 2007 alone more than 300 coaches were refurbished. The new trains are designated 10M3 (Cape Town), 10M4 (Gauteng) or 10M5 (Durban).

The Metrorail services on the Eastern Cape are operated by four diesel trains, each consisting of ten coaches and a diesel locomotive.

280 train sets operate on the system, each able to carry up to 1,800 passengers.

In October 2013, Gibela was awarded a contract to build 600 X'Trapolis Mega EMU trainsets (3,600 cars), the first half of a multi-phase rolling stock renewal program that would see up to 1,200 new trainsets delivered by the 2030s.

Safety concerns
In recent years, much concern has been raised about the safety of passengers on Metrorail trains, both due to crime and accidents. Serious incidents include murders and assaults on-board trains; several level crossing accidents, and a crash in Soweto.  An organisation called the Rail Commuters Action Group instituted a lawsuit against Metrorail and the government to force them to invest more money in security. The case reached the Constitutional Court, which declared that Metrorail has "an obligation to ensure that reasonable measures are taken to provide for the security of rail commuters".  Despite this, safety on the trains remains a dire concern.

Metrorail services have also suffered from instances of arson of train-sets which occurred during passenger protests but not necessarily by disgruntled passengers, in some cases forcing the closure of lines; as well as incidents of cable theft disrupting services.

In 2006 the Faure level crossing accident killed 19 people.

See also
 Transnet
 Spoornet
 Gautrain
 Johannesburg-Durban High Speed Rail

References

External links

 SARCC website
 Metrorail website
 Metrorail Cape Town website
 Transnet website
 Spoornet website
 South African Trains - A Pictorial Encyclopaedia

 
Transport operators of South Africa
Passenger rail transport in South Africa